Isiah Cage (born August 26, 1993) is a professional Canadian football offensive tackle for the Toronto Argonauts of the Canadian Football League (CFL).

College career
Cage played college football for the Concordia Golden Bears for two seasons before transferring to play for the  Wisconsin–Eau Claire Blugolds.

Professional career

Indianapolis Colts
Cage originally signed with the Indianapolis Colts of the National Football League (NFL) on May 2, 2016, but spent the entire 2016 season on the injured list with an unspecified injury. He was later released on May 3, 2017.

Toronto Argonauts
Cage spent 2017 out of football and was considering other career options, when he discussed the CFL in-depth with former BC Lions offensive tackle Jovan Olafioye. He subsequently signed with the Toronto Argonauts as a free agent on May 21, 2018. He spent most of the 2018 season on the practice roster before playing in and starting his first career professional game on October 12, 2018. He started the final four games of the 2018 season at left tackle.

In 2019, he played and started in seven regular season games before suffering a season-ending injury in the Touchdown Atlantic game on August 25, 2019, against the Montreal Alouettes in Moncton, New Brunswick. He did not play in 2020 due to the cancellation of the 2020 CFL season. During 2021 training camp, Cage injured his ankle and was sidelined for the entire season on the injured list.

Just prior to the 2022 season opener, Cage slipped in the shower and suffered a concussion and missed the first three games of the regular season. After not playing in a game for nearly three years since the 2019 Touchdown Atlantic game, Cage returned to play in the 2022 Touchdown Atlantic game in Wolfville, Nova Scotia, on July 16, 2022.

References

External links
Toronto Argonauts bio 

1993 births
Living people
American football offensive linemen
Canadian football offensive linemen
Players of Canadian football from Chicago
Indianapolis Colts players
Toronto Argonauts players
Concordia Golden Bears football players
Players of American football from Chicago
Wisconsin–Eau Claire Blugolds football players